Gloria Jean Ehret (born August 23, 1941) is a former American professional golfer best known for winning the 1966 LPGA Championship.

Early life and education
Ehret was born in Allentown, Pennsylvania. She attended St. Petersburg Junior College in St. Petersburg, Florida.

Golf career
Ehret turned professional in 1965. She finished fifth in the LPGA Championship in her rookie season and won it the following year. After over six years on tour without another victory, she won the Birmingham Classic in 1973. Her most lucrative year on the LPGA Tour was 1978 when she earned $42,470.60, placed 22nd on the final money list, and had three 2nd or T-2 finishes.

Amateur wins (4)
1963 Tri-State Amateur Championship
1964 Tri-State Amateur Championship, International Four-Ball, Connecticut State Amateur

Professional wins (3)

LPGA Tour wins (2)

LPGA Tour playoff record (1–4)

Other wins (1)
1965 Yankee Women's Open (with Judy Kimball)

Major championships

Wins (1)

References

External links

American female golfers
LPGA Tour golfers
Winners of LPGA major golf championships
Golfers from Pennsylvania
St. Petersburg College alumni
Sportspeople from Allentown, Pennsylvania
1941 births
Living people
21st-century American women